Enrique Sanz Unzué (born 11 September 1989) is a Spanish professional cyclist, who currently rides for UCI ProTeam .

Sanz comes from a sporting family; he is the nephew of the  general manager, Eusebio Unzué, while his father Enrique and brother Jorge also work for the team. Another uncle, Juan Carlos Unzué, is a former professional footballer and assistant manager of FC Barcelona.

Major results

2011
 1st Stage 2 Vuelta a la Comunidad de Madrid
2012
 3rd Circuito de Getxo
 6th Vuelta a La Rioja
 7th Coppa Bernocchi
2013
 5th Trofeo Campos–Santanyí–Ses Salines
 7th Vuelta a La Rioja
2015
 6th Circuito de Getxo
2017
 8th Trofeo Playa de Palma
2018
 4th Trofeo Palma
2019
 Volta ao Alentejo
1st Stages 1, 2 & 6
 4th Circuito de Getxo
 8th Overall Vuelta a Castilla y León
1st Stage 3
2020
 1st Stage 3 Belgrade Banjaluka 
 4th Trofeo Campos, Porreres, Felanitx, Ses Salines 
2021
 1st Stage 6 Volta ao Alentejo
 2nd Poreč Trophy
 4th Clàssica Comunitat Valenciana 1969

References

External links 

1989 births
Living people
Spanish male cyclists
Sportspeople from Pamplona
Cyclists from Navarre